Isaiah Prince (born July 29, 1997) is an American football offensive tackle for the Denver Broncos of the National Football League (NFL). He played college football at Ohio State. He was drafted by the Miami Dolphins in the sixth round of the 2019 NFL Draft.

College career
Coming to Ohio State, Prince was one of only 4 true freshmen to play for the Buckeyes in 2015 earning his first varsity letter.  He became a starter at right tackle during his sophomore year, starting all 13 games.  After his sophomore year, he was the only member of the 2015 Ohio State recruits to play every game over the past 2 seasons.  Going into his junior year, Prince was temporarily moved to left tackle switching spots with lineman Thayer Munford. They switched back before the start of the season.

Professional career

Miami Dolphins
Prince was drafted by the Miami Dolphins in the sixth round, 202nd overall, of the 2019 NFL Draft. He played in four games with two starts before being waived on December 5, 2019.

Cincinnati Bengals
On December 6, 2019, Prince was claimed off waivers by the Cincinnati Bengals.

On July 31, 2020, Prince announced he would opt out of the 2020 season due to the COVID-19 pandemic.

During the 2021 NFL season Isaha Prince took over for the injured Riley Reiff. Prince started all Playoffgames and Super Bowl 51 at right tackle. 

On September 2, 2022, Prince was placed on injured reserve with an elbow injury. He was activated on November 21, then waived and re-signed to the practice squad.

Denver Broncos
On February 1, 2023, Prince signed a reserve/future contract with the Denver Broncos.

References

External links
Ohio State Buckeyes bio

1997 births
Living people
People from Greenbelt, Maryland
Players of American football from Maryland
Sportspeople from the Washington metropolitan area
American football offensive tackles
Ohio State Buckeyes football players
Miami Dolphins players
Cincinnati Bengals players
Denver Broncos players